Leandro Vilela Sales Teixeira (born 29 June 1995) is a Brazilian footballer who plays for Guarani as a midfielder.

Club career
A product of the youth academy of Paraná Clube, Vilela impressed the club's technical staff during the 2014 São Paulo Junior Football Cup and was subsequently promoted to the first team. In his first season with the club, he contributed with nine matches (two of which were as a starter) and scoring one goal. On 2 June 2015, he signed a contract extension which would keep him at the club till 2017.

In order to get more first team opportunities, Vilela joined fourth tier club J. Malucelli Futebol on a three month long loan deal on 2 May 2016. He became a regular in the Paraná squad in the 2017 season. During a match against Clube de Regatas Brasil, he won the praise of manager Lisca, who called Vilela a "blank check" for the club. In October, he was ruled out of play for 40 days, following an injury. He contributed with 27 matches as his side won promotion to the Série A.

At the start of the 2018 season, Vilela was appointed as the club captain.

On 7 January 2019, Vilela was loaned out to Vitória for the upcoming season.

On 24 June 2019, he signed a 3-year contract with Portuguese Primeira Liga club Vitória de Setúbal.

Career statistics

Personal life
Vilela is a supporter of the Paraná Clube. His uncle Emerson Bandido played for the club and was a part of the squad which won promotion to Série A in 2000. Vilela has said that his uncle is a source of inspiration for him.

References

External links

1995 births
Living people
Association football midfielders
Brazilian footballers
Campeonato Brasileiro Série A players
Campeonato Brasileiro Série B players
Campeonato Brasileiro Série D players
Primeira Liga players
Paraná Clube players
J. Malucelli Futebol players
Esporte Clube Vitória players
Vitória F.C. players
Brazilian expatriate footballers
Expatriate footballers in Portugal
Footballers from Curitiba